The 2022–23 Coupe de France preliminary rounds, Centre-Val de Loire is the qualifying competition to decide which teams from the leagues of the Centre-Val de Loire region of France take part in the main competition from the seventh round.

A total of six teams will qualify from the Centre-Val de Loire preliminary rounds. Preliminary rounds start on 11 June 2022.

In 2021–22, C'Chartres Football progressed furthest in the main competition, reaching the round of 64, where they were beaten by US Chauvigny, from the division below, and missing out on a tie against Olympique de Marseille in the next round.

Draws and fixtures
In late April 2022, the league published their plans to hold three preliminary rounds in June 2022. However, when the first round draw was made on 31 May 2022, this had been reduced to one round in June and one in August. Originally, 104 teams from the District divisions entered at the first round stage, with 23 District 1 teams given byes to the second round. On 20 July 2022, the league announced that due to changes higher up the structure (specifically the reprieve of SO Romorantin in Championnat National 2), six District 1 teams previously exempted from the first round would need to play a first round tie on 21 August 2022.

The second round draw was also published on 20 July 2022, with 77 teams from divisions up to Régional 1 entering at this stage. The third round draw was published on 30 August 2022, with 10 teams from Championnat National 3 joining the 66 qualifiers from the second round for a total of 38 ties. The fourth round draw was published on 14 September 2022, with the 6 teams from Championnat National 2 joining at this stage. The fifth and sixth rounds were drawn together on 27 September 2022, with the two teams from Championnat National joining the competition at the fifth round stage.

First round
The first 52 matches were played on 15, 18 and 19 June 2022. Tiers refer to 2021–22 season. Three additional matches were played on 20 August 2022.

Second round
These matches were played on 26, 27 and 28 August 2022.

Third round
These matches were played on 10 and 11 September 2022.

Fourth round
These matches were played on 24 and 25 September 2022.

Fifth round
These matches were played on 8 and 9 October 2022.

Sixth round
These matches were played on 15 and 16 October 2022.

References

Preliminary rounds